Sitar in Petersburg is the annual non-commercial music festival first held in 2008 on the initiative of a group of musicians under the guidance of Aleksandr Konanchuk, a sitar player, and with the support of St.Petersburg State Roerich Family Museum-Institute, St.Petersburg State Museum of Theatre and Music, and the Consulate General of India in St.Petersburg, Russia. Since 2011 St.Petersburg State Roerich Family Museum-Institute has become the organizer of the festival. The festival is also supported by the Committee of Culture of St.Petersburg.
The festival program includes concerts of Indian classical music and dances with participation of both Indian and Russian performers, exhibitions of Indian musical instruments, thematic arts exhibitions, lectures and workshops dedicated to the basics of Indian classical music and to playing the sitar. 
Festival events take place throughout the year at the concert halls of the organizations that provide support to the project: “More chaya” (“Sea of Tea”) Tea Club, DK Gorkogo, Youth Center of the Vasileostrovsky district, and others.

Participants of the festival
	Aleksandr Konanchuk
	Sergey Gasanov
	Larisa Ragosa
	Sergey Donchenko
	Wladimir Yeliseyev
	Viktor Khan

See also
List of Indian classical music festivals

External links
 http://www.roerich.spb.ru/en/en/sitar/ Page dedicated to the festival on the website of St.Petersburg State Roerichs Family Museum-Institute
 http://www.sitarspb.info/index.php/ Official website of the festival (in Russian)
 https://www.youtube.com/user/HappyMedum/videos?view=0 (YouTube Channel of the Festival - video history of Sitar in Petersburg 2008-2011)
 https://www.youtube.com/watch?v=73VjjKe5rC4&feature=player_embedded (Sitar in Petersburg 2012 Day 1)
 https://www.youtube.com/watch?v=VMFy2UAATV4&feature=relmfu (Sitar in Petersburg 2012 Main Event)

Indian classical music
Music festivals in Russia
2008 establishments in Russia
Folk festivals in Russia
Hindustani classical music festivals
Music festivals established in 2008
Classical music festivals in Russia
Festivals of Indian culture